Big Brain Academy: Wii Degree, known in the PAL region as Big Brain Academy for Wii and in Japan as , is a video game released for the Wii. A sequel to the game Big Brain Academy for the Nintendo DS, it too measures a player's brain's weight, but with new games and puzzles to solve. The game makes use of Miis and uses WiiConnect24 features, allowing competition amongst users' friends, whose codes are automatically imported from the Wii's internal address book.

A sequel, Big Brain Academy: Brain vs. Brain, was announced for Nintendo Switch on September 2, 2021, and was released on December 3, 2021.

Gameplay
Big Brain Academy: Wii Degree includes a single-player mode whereby the player uses a brain to effectively answer questions correctly. The game also includes a multiplayer mode, where the player can competitively train against other players. Big Brain Academy: Wii Degree makes use of the Wii Remote, allowing the player to point and click on-screen.

Minigames
There are 15 mini-games within Big Brain Academy: Wii Degree, divided into five categories:
 Identify (identification-themed questions)
Whack Match
Fast Focus 
Species Spotlight
 Memorize (memory-themed questions)
Covered Cages
Face Case
Reverse Retention
 Analyze (reason-based questions) 
Match Blast
Speed Sorting 
Block Spot 
 Compute (math-themed questions)
Balloon Burst 
Mallet Math 
Colour Count
 Visualize (visual-themed questions) 
Art Parts
Train Turn 
Odd One Out

Solo mode
In this mode, the player is challenged with each of the five categories in random order. There are 12 questions per category (four for each minigame), resulting in 60 questions in total. The player is scored based on speed and accuracy; the faster one answers a question, the more "grams" they earn (which represents their score), but an incorrect answer scores no grams. The difficulty of the questions adjusts based on the player's score.

Each mini-game can be played separately, and depending on the results, the player can be awarded a medal, according to their score. There are four levels of difficulty: Easy, Medium, Hard, and Expert. The Expert level is not visible until gold or platinum medals are acquired on all of the previous three. Platinum Medals can be earned in each of the difficulty levels (Easy, Medium, Hard, and Expert), but the score needed to do so differs in each level.

Multiplayer

The four multiplayer modes in Big Brain Academy: Wii Degree allow the player to test their brain against up to seven other players.

Mind Sprint allows two players to go head-to-head in a split-screened race, and up to eight players can play as two teams. If a player answers incorrectly, they are stopped for about a second and have to answer the same question. One player or team can compete against player records (a computer opponent with skills based on that player's best test performance).

In Mental Marathon a team works together (or an individual works alone) to score as many points as possible within a time limit. Extra time is rewarded after each question, based on the length of the next question; less time is awarded as the game goes on. One mistake ends the game. A maximum score of 100 is possible.

In Brain Quiz players take turns choosing from a selection of 12 categories. Each category has a difficulty attached to it, though this is hidden until the category is selected. When the player selects a category with a red ?, if the player is lucky the difficulty is medium with double points, if unlucky the difficulty is expert. During their turn, players must try to answer as many questions as possible within the time limit, but one wrong answer ends the turn. This mode is notable for having 5 extra games, one from each category, that do not appear elsewhere in the game. The five games only in this mode are Order Out (Memorize), True View (Visualize), Tick-Tock Turn (Compute), Pattern Puzzle (Analyze), and Frame Filler (Identify), for a total of twenty games.

In Academic Succession two teams of two are assembled. Each team starts with one player. Each team alternates turns deciding on the category for the next question. The selected player from each team races to answer the question. When a player gets the question right, they switch places with their teammate. Big Brain Academy is considered the best college in the country.

Online connectivity
Big Brain Academy: Wii Degree allows players to exchange Student Record Books with friends who also own the game, anywhere in the world, using Nintendo Wi-Fi Connection. A player's Student Record Book contains their latest Test result and details of the medals earned in-game. Players can compete against other players in a "Mind Sprint" mode, using each other's Student Record Books to work out how well each player would perform against each other and choose the mini-games to play accordingly.

Reception

Big Brain Academy: Wii Degree received mostly positive reviews, scoring an average score of 72% on game-tracking website MobyGames. Gaming website IGN gave the game a score of 7.6 (out of 10), praising it for being "both easy to pick up and really fun to play, especially with friends", but criticizing it for being short and "shallow", and also for not including a proper online mode. GameSpot also scored the game positively, giving it a score of 7.3 out of 10. Conversely, they praised it for having a "decent number of different games and difficulties to choose from", and also for its use of Miis, while criticizing that many of the multiplayer modes require passing the controller around.

As of December 31, 2007, Big Brain Academy: Wii Degree has sold two million copies worldwide, with 380,000 of those copies being sold in Japan. It received a "Double Platinum" sales award from the Entertainment and Leisure Software Publishers Association (ELSPA), indicating sales of at least 600,000 copies in the United Kingdom.

See also
List of Wii games

References

External links 
Big Brain Academy: Wii Degree's official site
Big Brain Academy: Wii Degree on Nintendo
Big Brain Academy: Wii Degree on IGN

2007 video games
Nintendo Entertainment Analysis and Development games
Wii-only games
Touch! Generations
Nintendo games
Wii games
Multiplayer and single-player video games
Video games developed in Japan
Video games scored by Ryo Nagamatsu